{{DISPLAYTITLE:C22H31N3O5}}
The molecular formula C22H31N3O5 (molar mass: 417.50 g/mol) may refer to:

 Cilazapril
 Cinepazide, or cinepazide maleate

Molecular formulas